The Chico State Wildcats college football team represented California State University, Chico. The Wildcats competed in the California Coast Conference from 1922–1928.  They moved to the Far West Conference in 1929, staying in the conference until the end of the football program in 1996. It had been renamed the Northern California Athletic Conference in 1983. The team played in the (NCAA) College Division, then NCAA Division II.

The program had 14 identifiable head coaches in its 74 years of competitive existence. Prior to World War I, Chico State played sporadic games against local High Schools.

Coaches

Notes

References

Chico State Wildcats

Chico State Wildcats football coaches